The 1934 Stanford Indians football team represented Stanford University in the 1934 college football season. In head coach Tiny Thornill's second season, the Indians allowed only 14 points during the entire regular season, logged seven shutout victories, and were undefeated in the Pacific Coast Conference. The team represented the conference in the Rose Bowl, losing to Alabama, 29–13.

The team was rated No. 1 by the contemporary Houlgate System and presented with the Foreman & Clark national championship trophy.

Schedule

References

Stanford
Stanford Cardinal football seasons
Pac-12 Conference football champion seasons
Stanford Indians football